Den norske Creditbank or DnC is a defunct Norwegian commercial bank created in 1857. In 1990 it merged with Bergen Bank to create Den norske Bank (DnB). The bank was based in Oslo and listed on the Oslo Stock Exchange.

History
During the 1960s and ’70s, the bank bought and merged with a number of regional and local banks in Norway, including Odda By- og Bygdebank (1964), Porsgrunds Ørebank (1964), Røkens Bank 1964, Oplandske Kreditbank (1966), Horten og Omegns Privatbank (1970), Privatbanken i Sandefjord (1970), Østfold Privatbank (1970), Finnmarkens Privatbank (1973), Haugesunds Forretningsbank (1973) and Opplandsbanken (1980).

During the 1980s, DnC had expanded significantly both in Norway and internationally, and was Norway's largest bank at the time. During the bank crisis the bank suffered severe losses and in an effort to save the bank it succeeded in merging with Bergen Bank, Norway's third largest bank.

Defunct banks of Norway
Companies formerly listed on the Oslo Stock Exchange
Companies based in Oslo
Banks established in 1857
Banks disestablished in 1990
DNB ASA
1990 disestablishments in Norway
Norwegian companies established in 1857